In mathematics, the Dershowitz–Manna ordering is a well-founded ordering on multisets named after Nachum Dershowitz and Zohar Manna. It is often used in context of termination of programs or term rewriting systems.

For multisets  we define the Dershowitz–Manna ordering  as follows:

 whenever there exist two multisets  with the following properties:
,
,
, and
 dominates , that is, for all  , there is some  such that .

An equivalent definition was given by Huet and Oppen as follows:

 if and only if 
, and

References
. (Also in Proceedings of the International Colloquium on Automata, Languages and Programming, Graz, Lecture Notes in Computer Science 71, Springer-Verlag, pp. 188–202 [July 1979].)
.
.

Formal languages
Logic in computer science
Rewriting systems